The  is a limited express train service in Japan operated by the West Japan Railway Company (JR West) since 1964. It runs between Nagoya and Kanazawa. Shirasagi (白鷺) is the Japanese name for the "egret", a white heron.

Rolling stock
Services are normally operated using Kanazawa-based 681 series and 683-8000 series EMUs formed as 6-, 6+3-, or 6+3+3-car formations. Services were originally formed of 7-car 485 series, 489 series and 5-, 5+3-, or 5+3+3-car 683 series EMUs.

History
The Shirasagi service was first introduced on 25 December 1964.

See also
 List of named passenger trains of Japan

References

Named passenger trains of Japan
Railway services introduced in 1964
West Japan Railway Company
1964 establishments in Japan